Bakers Island Light is a historic lighthouse on Bakers Island in Salem, Massachusetts. The station was originally established in 1791, with a daymark. This was replaced in 1798 by two lights atop a keeper's house, one at each end. After storm damage in 1815, an octagonal stone tower was constructed.  The current round stone tower was added in 1820. The 1820 tower was taller, leading to the names "Ma" and "Pa".  The two remained in service until 1926, when the older, shorter tower was removed.

The light was added to the National Register of Historic Places as Baker's Island Light Station in 1976.

Nomenclature
The City of Salem, the Coast Guard, and NOAA spell the name without an apostrophe, but the National Register of Historic Places includes it. The name is always written with the "s".

See also
 National Register of Historic Places listings in Salem, Massachusetts
 List of lighthouses in the United States, Massachusetts

References

Lighthouses completed in 1798
Lighthouses completed in 1815
Towers completed in 1815
Lighthouses completed in 1820
Lighthouses on the National Register of Historic Places in Massachusetts
Buildings and structures in Salem, Massachusetts
Lighthouses in Essex County, Massachusetts
National Register of Historic Places in Salem, Massachusetts